Erik Blumenfeld (March 27, 1915 – April 10, 1997) was a German politician of the Christian Democratic Union (CDU) and former member of the German Bundestag.

Life 
Blumenfeld was a founding member of the CDU in Hamburg. As early as 1946, Blumenfeld was first elected to the Hamburg parliament in the Harvestehude constituency and remained a member until 1955. From 1966 to 1970 and from 1978 to 1979 he was again a member of the Bürgerschaft.

In 1961 he became a member of the German Bundestag and in 1973 also of the European Parliament. In addition to his Bundestag activities, he was again a member of the Hamburg Parliament from 1966 to 1970 and from 1978 to 30 September 1979. He left the Bundestag in 1980 and the European Parliament in 1989.

Literature

References

1915 births
1997 deaths
Members of the Bundestag for Hamburg
Members of the Bundestag 1976–1980
Members of the Bundestag 1972–1976
Members of the Bundestag 1969–1972
Members of the Bundestag 1965–1969
Members of the Bundestag 1961–1965
Members of the Bundestag for the Christian Democratic Union of Germany
Members of the Hamburg Parliament
MEPs for Germany 1958–1979